Ridazolol is a pharmaceutical drug acting as a beta adrenergic receptor antagonist. It was investigated in the 1980 and 90s for its effects on coronary heart disease and essential hypertension (high blood pressure).

It is not known to be marketed anywhere in the world.

References

Beta blockers
Chloroarenes
Pyridazines